The PM2 (short for Indonesian: "Pistol Mitraliur 2", "Submachine Gun 2") is a submachine gun manufactured by Pindad of Indonesia. This sub-machine gun is intended to be used by forest guard authorities and by law enforcement.

History
Overseas, the PM2 was first shown to foreign visitors at the 2009 Tri-Service Asian Defense and Internal Security Event for Land, Sea and Air and Security event at the IMPACT Exhibition Center in Bangkok, Thailand.

The PM2 went on display in 2013 before VIPs at the Pusat Pendidikan Kavaleri in Bandung.

Design
The Pindad PM2 is a submachine gun based on the Pindad SS2, using a similar receiver (although changed to use 9×19mm ammunition), grip, and folding stock. It is designed to exceed the performance of the popular German-made Heckler & Koch MP5. It has a standard MIL-STD-1913 rail on top for optics and comes with a suppressor.

Variants

PM2-V1
The V1 weighs 3.18 kg with its magazine. It is 625 mm long with a blowback firing system, outfitted with a folding stock.

PM2-V2
The V2 is fixed with an integral suppressor. It weighs 3.45 kg and is 720 mm long with a folding stock.

PM2-V3
The V3 is fixed with a forward grip and is longer than the V1 but shorter than the V2. It has a picatinny rail on the top body and has a different stock and grip design.

Users

 : Indonesian Army and Kopassus.
 : 75 PM2-V1s bought from PT Pindad. Secretary of State Francisco Guterres demanded an answer from the company responsible for importing the PM2-V1s after a senior PNTL officer informed Tempo Semanala that a training session showed some of the submachine guns were defective.

References

External links 
 Senjata Jagawana

9mm Parabellum submachine guns
Firearms of Indonesia
Post–Cold War military equipment of Indonesia